Thomas Slade (1703/4–1771) was a naval architect.

Thomas or Tom Slade may also refer to:
Thomas Slade (MP) for Huntingdon (UK Parliament constituency) in 1572
Tom Slade (1952–2006), American football player
Tom Slade Jr. (1936–2014), American politician